Nina Christiansen (born 7 June 1964) is a Danish long-distance runner. She competed in the women's 5000 metres at the 1996 Summer Olympics.

References

1964 births
Living people
Athletes (track and field) at the 1996 Summer Olympics
Danish female long-distance runners
Olympic athletes of Denmark
Place of birth missing (living people)